The 4th TCA Awards were presented by the Television Critics Association. The ceremony was held on August 5, 1988, at the Registry Hotel in Los Angeles, Calif.

Winners

Multiple wins 
The following shows received multiple wins:

References

External links
Official website
1988 TCA Awards at IMDb.com

1988 television awards
1988 in American television
TCA Awards ceremonies